Chris King (born August 19, 1969) is a former American soccer player who played with various clubs in the National Professional Soccer League in the 1990s.

Playing career
King began his professional career in 1991 when he was drafted by Dayton Dynamo of the National Professional Soccer League. He would play with Dayton for four seasons and appeared in 118 matches, and recorded 27 goals. In 1995, Dayton was purchased and relocated to Cincinnati to become Cincinnati Silverbacks, where he appeared in five matches and scored one goal. Midway through the season he was traded to Chicago Power, and appeared in 18 matches and recorded three goals. In 1996, Chicago was relocated to Edmonton, instead of signing a contract with Edmonton he decided to retire from competitive soccer.  

After retiring from soccer he went into coaching and served as technical director for Ohio Premier Women's SC for fourteen years. On December 17, 2013 he was appointed director of coaching for Chicago Eclipse Select.

References

1969 births
Living people
American soccer coaches
American soccer players
Sportspeople from Xenia, Ohio
Soccer players from Ohio
Association football forwards
Dayton Dynamo (NPSL) players
Cincinnati Silverbacks players
Chicago Power (NPSL) players
National Professional Soccer League (1984–2001) players